James Douglas Campbell Bryant (born 4 February 1976) is a former South African cricketer. He played first-class cricket for nine years, for Eastern Province, Nottinghamshire, Somerset and Derbyshire, retiring from senior cricket in 2005.

A superb hitter in his own country, with a high score of 234 not out, he seemed to struggle more than he should have in England, where his game suffered from a lack of confidence. On his Derbyshire debut he broke his hand, and never played for such a high standard while at the club.

He also dislocated his collarbone in 2005, and his frequent injuries as well as his poor form away from home, mean that it is unlikely that he is going to be signed by another English club.  From 2006 – 2008 was signed as a professional for three-time Village Cricket Champions Troon playing in Cornwall League division 1.

References

External links
 

1976 births
Living people
South African cricketers
Eastern Province cricketers
Derbyshire cricketers
Somerset cricketers
Alumni of Maritzburg College